Hennummarka is a village in Lier municipality, Norway. Located just north of the village Tranby, it is a part of the urban area Tranby which has a population of 5,580.

References

Villages in Buskerud